The Baihetan Dam is a large hydroelectric dam on the Jinsha River, an upper stretch of the  Yangtze River in Sichuan and Yunnan provinces, in southwest China. The dam is a 289-meter-tall double-curvature arch dam with a crest elevation of 827 m, and a width of 72 m at the base and 13 m at the crest. It is considered to be the last large hydropower project in China after a series of projects starting with the Three Gorges Dam. It is also the second largest hydropower plant in the world. The hydropower station is equipped with 16 hydro-generating units that each have a capacity of 1 million kilowatts, making it the largest single-unit capacity globally. All hydro-generating units of the Baihetan hydropower station became fully operational on 20 December 2022.

The dam is also part of the “world’s largest clean energy corridor”, where it joins other mega hydropower projects like the Three Gorges Dam, Wudongde Dam, Xiluodu Dam, and Xiangjiaba Dam, all located on the same river system, to produce and transmit renewable energy from the resource-rich western region to the cities in the east. In addition to power generation, the hydropower project also provides flood control, improved navigation, and sand blocking.

History 
In June 1959, an on-site survey was conducted at Qiaojia by a domestic expert group and a Czechoslovakian expert group and, consequently, the future site for the Baihetan Power Station was selected. However, the breaking down of relations during the Sino-Soviet split in 1962, resulted in the survey team being withdrawn. The beginning of China’s “Cultural Revolution" also saw the construction plans becoming shelved for many years. It wasn't until August 3, 2017, when construction of the main dam was officially started. An opening ceremony took place on February 5, 2021, and storage of water behind the dam commenced on April 7 of the same year, and by April 24, the water storage elevation of the  hydro plant had risen over 720 meters. On 20 December 2022, the formal completion of Baihetan Hydropower Station was achieved when the final hydro-generating unit was connected to the grid and began producing power.

Power generation 
In terms of generating capacity, it is the second largest hydroelectric power plant in the world, after the Three Gorges Dam. It is estimated to generate 62.44 billion kilowatt-hour (kWh) annually and will save about 90.45 million tons of coal per year and consequently reduce annual carbon emissions by 248.4 million tonnes.

Construction 
Surveying of the dam site was done in 1992. In 2008, the original plan for the construction of Baihetan Hydropower Station, was formally started. In December 2008, the Baihetan site began construction. The dam was originally scheduled to be constructed between 2009 and 2018. The Jinsha River became officially closed on November 2014. Actual construction started on August 3, 2017.

The manufacturing of the first water guiding mechanism in the Baihetan Hydro-generator units was completed in Harbin, where it both passed inspection and was awarded approval on October 27, 2018. The first 1,000 MW turbine runner was completed at Dongfang Electric’s Baihetan Runner Processing Plant on January 12, 2019.

The reservoir first started storing water on 7 April 2021, and by 24 April, the water storage elevation of the power station had risen over 720 metres. The hydropower station started partial electricity generation in July of the same year. The dam was expected to be fully operational by July 2022. Experts have noted the 4-year construction period as being exceptionally fast for a project of its type.

On June 28, 2021, the Baihetan Dam began generating electricity, when the project's first two turbines started operating. The third turbine followed in July and the fourth in November of the same year. The final generating unit was connected to the grid on 20 December 2022.

Impact 
The dam and reservoir have particularly affected upstream Qiaojia County, providing thousands of jobs to local residents, while also requiring resettlement of 32 villages totaling  50,178 residents. Coinciding with the dam construction, the road network was also improved.

See also 

 Wudongde Dam, the next dam upstream
 Xiluodu Dam, the next dam downstream
 List of power stations in China
 List of largest power stations

References

Hydroelectric power stations in Yunnan
Hydroelectric power stations in Sichuan
Dams in China
Dams on the Jinsha River
Buildings and structures in Zhaotong
2021 establishments in China
Dams completed in 2021